849 Ara (prov. designation:  or ) is a large, metallic background asteroid, approximately  in diameter, that is located in the outer region of the asteroid belt. It was discovered on 9 February 1912, by Russian astronomer Sergey Belyavsky at the Simeiz Observatory on the Crimean peninsula. The M-type asteroid has a short rotation period of 4.1 hours and is likely elongated in shape. It was named after the American Relief Administration (ARA) for the help given during the Russian famine of 1921–22.

Orbit and classification 

Ara is a non-family asteroid of the main belt's background population when applying the hierarchical clustering method to its proper orbital elements. It orbits the Sun in the outer asteroid belt at a distance of 2.5–3.8 AU once every 5 years and 7 months (2,038 days; semi-major axis of 3.15 AU). Its orbit has an eccentricity of 0.20 and an inclination of 20° with respect to the ecliptic. In addition, Ara has a low Jupiter tisserand of 3.09, just above the defined threshold of 3.0 which is used to distinguish asteroids from the Jupiter-family comets. The body's observation arc begins at the Collegio Romano Observatory  in Italy on 3 July 1919, more than 6 years after its official discovery observation at Simeiz.

Naming 

This minor planet was named after American Relief Administration (ARA), in appreciation of the help it gave during the Russian famine of 1921–22. Headed by Herbert Hoover, ARA was a relief mission after World War I to Europe which also included post-revolutionary Russia later on. The  was mentioned in The Names of the Minor Planets by Paul Herget in 1955.

Physical characteristics 

In the Tholen classification as well as in the lesser known taxonomic method by Howell, Ara is a metallic M-type asteroid. This spectral type translates into the X-type in more modern asteroid taxonomic systems. In 2018 and 2019, a study using photometry from the Korea Microlensing Telescope Network and the South African Astronomical Observatory, grouped Ara into the X-type category based on the Bus–DeMeo classification.

Rotation period and pole 

In June 1981, a rotational lightcurve of Ara was obtained from photometric observations by Alan Harris. Lightcurve analysis gave a rotation period of  hours with a brightness variation of  magnitude, indicative of an elongated shape. Numerous observations have since confirmed this period. In 2017, a modeled lightcurve gave a concurring sidereal period of  hours as well as a spin axis of (223.0°, −41.0°) in ecliptic coordinates (λ, β).

Diameter and albedo 

In 2009 and 2015, several asteroid occultations of Ara were observed. These timed observations are taken when the asteroid passes in front of a distant star.

References

External links 
 Lightcurve Database Query (LCDB), at www.minorplanet.info
 Dictionary of Minor Planet Names, Google books
 Asteroids and comets rotation curves, CdR – Geneva Observatory, Raoul Behrend
 Discovery Circumstances: Numbered Minor Planets (1)-(5000) – Minor Planet Center
 
 

000849
Discoveries by Sergei Belyavsky
Named minor planets
000849
19120209

vec:Lista de asteroidi#849 Ara